Charlotte Ashton is a British television presenter. She presents Revealed... on BBC Switch alongside Anthony Baxter.

Career
Ashton started her career at BBC Radio 4 and has written for The Guardian newspaper.

Radio 1's Surgery with Kelly Osbourne
On Sunday 30 November 2008, Ashton hosted Radio 1's first surgery debate show with presenter Aled Haydn-Jones. The second debate show was on Sunday 18 January 2009, which Ashton hosted with Haydn-Jones and fellow Revealed... presenter Anthony Baxter.

Personal life
Ashton was born in Birmingham and now lives in London.

References

External links
Revealed... website

British television presenters
Living people
Year of birth missing (living people)